The 11th constituency of Bouches-du-Rhône is a French legislative constituency in Bouches-du-Rhône.

Deputies

Elections

2022

 
 
 
 
 
 
 
 
|-
| colspan="8" bgcolor="#E9E9E9"|
|-

2017

2012

|- style="background-color:#E9E9E9;text-align:center;"
! colspan="2" rowspan="2" style="text-align:left;" | Candidate
! rowspan="2" colspan="2" style="text-align:left;" | Party
! colspan="2" | 1st round
! colspan="2" | 2nd round
|- style="background-color:#E9E9E9;text-align:center;"
! width="75" | Votes
! width="30" | %
! width="75" | Votes
! width="30" | %
|-
| style="background-color:" |
| style="text-align:left;" | Christian Kert
| style="text-align:left;" | Union for a Popular Movement
| UMP
| 
| 32.59%
| 
| 50.98%
|-
| style="background-color:" |
| style="text-align:left;" | Gaëlle Lenfant
| style="text-align:left;" | Socialist Party
| PS
| 
| 34.85%
| 
| 49.02%
|-
| style="background-color:" |
| style="text-align:left;" | Jean-Marie Cojannot
| style="text-align:left;" | Front National
| FN
| 
| 21.57%
| colspan="2" style="text-align:left;" |
|-
| style="background-color:" |
| style="text-align:left;" | Patrick Magro
| style="text-align:left;" | Left Front
| FG
| 
| 8.58%
| colspan="2" style="text-align:left;" |
|-
| style="background-color:" |
| style="text-align:left;" | Jean-Claude Auvigne
| style="text-align:left;" | Miscellaneous Right
| DVD
| 
| 1.20%
| colspan="2" style="text-align:left;" |
|-
| style="background-color:" |
| style="text-align:left;" | Stéphanie Clerc
| style="text-align:left;" | Far Left
| EXG
| 
| 0.49%
| colspan="2" style="text-align:left;" |
|-
| style="background-color:" |
| style="text-align:left;" | Vincent Cullard
| style="text-align:left;" | Other
| AUT
| 
| 0.40%
| colspan="2" style="text-align:left;" |
|-
| style="background-color:" |
| style="text-align:left;" | Corinne Morel
| style="text-align:left;" | Far Left
| EXG
| 
| 0.33%
| colspan="2" style="text-align:left;" |
|-
| style="background-color:" |
| style="text-align:left;" | Geneviève Jullien-Ortega
| style="text-align:left;" | Radical Party of the Left
| PRG
| 
| 0.00%
| colspan="2" style="text-align:left;" |
|-
| colspan="8" style="background-color:#E9E9E9;"|
|- style="font-weight:bold"
| colspan="4" style="text-align:left;" | Total
| 
| 100%
| 
| 100%
|-
| colspan="8" style="background-color:#E9E9E9;"|
|-
| colspan="4" style="text-align:left;" | Registered voters
| 
| style="background-color:#E9E9E9;"|
| 
| style="background-color:#E9E9E9;"|
|-
| colspan="4" style="text-align:left;" | Blank/Void ballots
| 
| 1.14%
| 
| 2.94%
|-
| colspan="4" style="text-align:left;" | Turnout
| 
| 57.08%
| 
| 55.72%
|-
| colspan="4" style="text-align:left;" | Abstentions
| 
| 42.92%
| 
| 44.28%
|-
| colspan="8" style="background-color:#E9E9E9;"|
|- style="font-weight:bold"
| colspan="6" style="text-align:left;" | Result
| colspan="2" style="background-color:" | UMP HOLD
|}

2007

|- style="background-color:#E9E9E9;text-align:center;"
! colspan="2" rowspan="2" style="text-align:left;" | Candidate
! rowspan="2" colspan="2" style="text-align:left;" | Party
! colspan="2" | 1st round
! colspan="2" | 2nd round
|- style="background-color:#E9E9E9;text-align:center;"
! width="75" | Votes
! width="30" | %
! width="75" | Votes
! width="30" | %
|-
| style="background-color:" |
| style="text-align:left;" | Christian Kert
| style="text-align:left;" | Union for a Popular Movement
| UMP
| 
| 49.97%
| 
| 61.41%
|-
| style="background-color:" |
| style="text-align:left;" | Gaëlle Lenfant
| style="text-align:left;" | Socialist Party
| PS
| 
| 21.48%
| 
| 38.59%
|-
| style="background-color:" |
| style="text-align:left;" | Catherine Casanova
| style="text-align:left;" | Democratic Movement
| MoDem
| 
| 8.79%
| colspan="2" style="text-align:left;" |
|-
| style="background-color:" |
| style="text-align:left;" | Sabine Diaz
| style="text-align:left;" | Front National
| FN
| 
| 5.27%
| colspan="2" style="text-align:left;" |
|-
| style="background-color:" |
| style="text-align:left;" | Nathalie Leconte
| style="text-align:left;" | Communist
| PCF
| 
| 3.00%
| colspan="2" style="text-align:left;" |
|-
| style="background-color:" |
| style="text-align:left;" | Philippe Adam
| style="text-align:left;" | Movement for France
| MPF
| 
| 2.50%
| colspan="2" style="text-align:left;" |
|-
| style="background-color:" |
| style="text-align:left;" | Marie-Line Codol
| style="text-align:left;" | Far Left
| EXG
| 
| 2.00%
| colspan="2" style="text-align:left;" |
|-
| style="background-color:" |
| style="text-align:left;" | Pauline Ricci
| style="text-align:left;" | Ecologist
| ECO
| 
| 1.59%
| colspan="2" style="text-align:left;" |
|-
| style="background-color:" |
| style="text-align:left;" | Pierre Pieve
| style="text-align:left;" | Ecologist
| ECO
| 
| 1.23%
| colspan="2" style="text-align:left;" |
|-
| style="background-color:" |
| style="text-align:left;" | Pascale Tourrenc
| style="text-align:left;" | Regionalist
| REG
| 
| 1.00%
| colspan="2" style="text-align:left;" |
|-
| style="background-color:" |
| style="text-align:left;" | Florence Morini
| style="text-align:left;" | Hunting, Fishing, Nature, Traditions
| CPNT
| 
| 1.00%
| colspan="2" style="text-align:left;" |
|-
| style="background-color:" |
| style="text-align:left;" | Geneviève Jullien Ortega
| style="text-align:left;" | Independent
| DIV
| 
| 0.79%
| colspan="2" style="text-align:left;" |
|-
| style="background-color:" |
| style="text-align:left;" | Sébastien Grenard
| style="text-align:left;" | Far Right
| EXD
| 
| 0.65%
| colspan="2" style="text-align:left;" |
|-
| style="background-color:" |
| style="text-align:left;" | Brigitte Espaze
| style="text-align:left;" | Far Left
| EXG
| 
| 0.65%
| colspan="2" style="text-align:left;" |
|-
| style="background-color:" |
| style="text-align:left;" | Djamel Delhoum
| style="text-align:left;" | Independent
| DIV
| 
| 0.24%
| colspan="2" style="text-align:left;" |
|-
| style="background-color:" |
| style="text-align:left;" | Nathalie Lagneau
| style="text-align:left;" | Miscellaneous Right
| DVD
| 
| 0.00%
| colspan="2" style="text-align:left;" |
|-
| colspan="8" style="background-color:#E9E9E9;"|
|- style="font-weight:bold"
| colspan="4" style="text-align:left;" | Total
| 
| 100%
| 
| 100%
|-
| colspan="8" style="background-color:#E9E9E9;"|
|-
| colspan="4" style="text-align:left;" | Registered voters
| 
| style="background-color:#E9E9E9;"|
| 
| style="background-color:#E9E9E9;"|
|-
| colspan="4" style="text-align:left;" | Blank/Void ballots
| 
| 1.55%
| 
| 3.20%
|-
| colspan="4" style="text-align:left;" | Turnout
| 
| 58.69%
| 
| 56.70%
|-
| colspan="4" style="text-align:left;" | Abstentions
| 
| 41.31%
| 
| 43.30%
|-
| colspan="8" style="background-color:#E9E9E9;"|
|- style="font-weight:bold"
| colspan="6" style="text-align:left;" | Result
| colspan="2" style="background-color:" | UMP HOLD
|}

2002

 
 
 
 
 
 
 
 
|-
| colspan="8" bgcolor="#E9E9E9"|
|-

1997

 
 
 
 
 
 
 
|-
| colspan="8" bgcolor="#E9E9E9"|
|-

References

11